The California Baptist Lancers women's basketball team is a basketball team that represents California Baptist University in Riverside, California, United States. The California Baptist Lancers compete as members of the Division I Western Athletic Conference (WAC). They are currently led by head coach Jarrod Olson and play at the CBU Events Center.

In the 2020-21 season, the Lancers won the WAC regular season championship with a perfect 14-0 record. Despite being ineligible for the NCAA tournament due to being in the third year of a four-year transition from Division II to Division I, they were allowed by the WAC to compete in the conference tournament. They won the semifinal and final matchups against New Mexico State and Grand Canyon, respectively, by 43 combined points. Under normal circumstances, Cal Baptist would have thus secured the automatic bid to the 2021 NCAA tournament from the conference, but due to its ineligible status was not allowed to participate in the NCAA tournament or any other NCAA-sponsored postseason tournament. Utah Valley, the WAC's second-place finisher in the regular season, received the WAC's automatic bid to the NCAA tournament (the program's first). The Lancers finished the year with a 26-1 record.

Postseason

NAIA Division I
The Lancers made the NAIA Division I women's basketball tournament two times, with a combined record of 1–2.

See also
 California Baptist Lancers men's basketball

References

External links